In politics, a party chair (often party chairperson/-man/-woman or party president) is the presiding officer of a political party. The nature and importance of the position differs from country to country, and also between political parties.

The role of a party chairman is often quite different from that of a party leader. The duties of the chairman are typically concerned with the party membership as a whole, and the activities of the party organization. Chairmen often play important roles in strategies to recruit and retain members, in campaign fundraising, and in internal party governance, where they may serve as a member of, or even preside over, a governing board or council. They often also have influence in candidate selections, and sometimes in the development and promulgation of party policy.

Examples

Belgium 
In Belgium, the top position of a political party is typically called its chairman (voorzitter/président), but its role is rather that of a party leader or even a combination of both. The party chairman/leader is the mightiest person within the party, controlling appointments etc. After the Prime Minister of Belgium the party chairmen are the most important figures in Belgian politics, sometimes characterized as a particracy. Following parliamentary elections, the party chairmen are the chief negotiators of the coalition agreement, and subsequently the chairman of the largest governing party typically becomes the Prime Minister and resigns as party chairman; he is replaced by a different chairman, usually interim. For example, PS chairman Elio Di Rupo became Prime Minister of the Di Rupo Government in 2011 and resumed the chairmanship in 2014 at the end of the government. He was replaced by Thierry Giet and Paul Magnette during this period.

Most major political parties elect their chairman by a vote of all the party's members. This practice was started by the Flemish liberal party in the 1990s.

China
The leader of Chinese Communist Party between 1943 and 1982 was the Chairman of the Chinese Communist Party. The post of Chairman was abolished in 1982, and most of its functions were transferred to the revived post of General Secretary. The move was made as part of a larger effort to distance the country from Maoist politics.

Netherlands
In the Netherlands, in contrast to Belgium, the chairmen are relatively weak, due to a separation of powers. Chairmen of political parties merely control the party organization, the bureau, and its finances, while the political leader, often the chair of the parliamentary party, decides over the party's political course. Many party chairmen go on to occupy more important posts. Ria Beckers for instance was chairman of the Political Party of Radicals, before she became chair of its parliamentary party. There is one important exception to the above picture: Jan Marijnissen, former political leader of the Socialist Party combined being political leader of its parliamentary party and chairman of the party itself.

United Kingdom
In the United Kingdom the term may refer to the holder of the office of Chairman of the Conservative Party or to a senior member of the Labour Party (not to be confused with the other Chairman of the Labour Party who chairs the NEC or the Chairman of the Parliamentary Labour Party elected solely by Labour MPs). This title was given to Labour's Harriet Harman after she was elected Deputy Leader of the Labour Party in June 2007.

United States
The chairmen of the Democratic National Committee (DNC) and Republican National Committee (RNC) serve as the operational heads of their respective political party. In addition, each state and territory has their own Democratic and Republican Party which also have chairmen or chairwomen.

See also
Party leader

Organizational structure of political parties